Maschukia is a subgenus of moths of the family Noctuidae.

References

External links
Natural History Museum Lepidoptera genus database

Hadeninae